The Center for Financial Studies (CFS) (Gesellschaft für Kapitalmarktforschung), located in Frankfurt am Main, is an independent research institute affiliated to the Goethe University Frankfurt. CFS conducts independent and internationally oriented research on important topics in finance. It serves as a forum for dialogue between academia, policy makers and the financial industry. It also provides a platform for high-level basic as well as applied research of relevance to the European financial sector. 

Its president is Axel A. Weber, former President of Deutsche Bundesbank and former Chairman of the board of UBS Group AG. Otmar Issing is Honorary President. Directors are Andreas Hackethal and Rainer Klump. The managing director is Volker Brühl. The institute's sponsoring association is chaired by Jürgen Fitschen, former co-head of Deutsche Bank AG.

Research 
CFS’ research program consists of research areas that are each managed by the directors. Guest researchers and fellows visit the institute regularly and collaborate on research projects with the academic staff at the CFS.

Dialogue 
The CFS aims to promote the dialogue between academia and the financial community by regularly organizing conferences, colloquia, academic forum discussions and specialist presentations on finance-related issues. It also participates in international research networks.

CFS Index 
Since 2007, the Center for Financial Studies has carried out a quarterly survey amongst leading executives in the German financial community. The purpose is to aggregate their evaluations and expectations in order to reflect the current business sentiment. In addition, special surveys on topical issues are held.
The CFS Index has emerged from a cooperation of academics, business and politics.

History 
In 1964 on the occasion of the 50th anniversary of the Goethe University Frankfurt, some banks, in particular private bankers and the Frankfurt Stock Exchange, set up a fund for establishing a research institute. 1967 the institute was founded under the name Institut für Kapitalmarktforschung (IFK). The institute is, still today, financed by the Gesellschaft für Kapitalmarktforschung e.V. (GfK) which was founded in the same year. Among the more than 80 members of GfK are banks, insurances, consultancy companies and industrial enterprises. The institute was the first research institute in Germany dedicated solely to capital market issues. 1996 the institute was given the additional name Center for Financial Studies to reflect the increasingly international orientation of its research activities. Since 2001 this has become its sole name. In 2005 the CFS in cooperation with Goethe University Frankfurt for the first time awarded "The Deutsche Bank Prize in Financial Economics" to an internationally renowned researcher. Between 2006 and June 2022 the former chief economist of the European Central Bank, Otmar Issing, was president of the CFS. The current president is Axel A. Weber, former President of the Deutsche Bundesbank, and former chairman of the board of UBS AG.

References

External links
 official website
 CFS Index
 website House of Finance

Goethe University Frankfurt
Education in Frankfurt